In Muslim tradition the Quran is the final revelation from God, Islam's divine text, delivered to the Islamic prophet Muhammad through the angel Jibril (Gabriel). Muhammad's revelations were said to have been recorded orally and in writing, through Muhammad and his followers up until his death in 632 CE. This has been critiqued by some western scholarship, suggesting the Quran was canonized at a later date, based on the dating of classical Islamic narratives, i.e. hadiths, which were written 150–200 years after the death of Muhammad, and partly because of the textual variations present in the Sana'a manuscript. With the discovery of earlier manuscripts which conform to the Uthmanic standard however, the revisionist view has fallen out of favor and been described as "untenable", with western scholarship generally supporting the classical Muslim view.

More than 60 fragments including more than 2000 folios (4000 pages) are so far known as the textual witnesses (manuscripts) of the Qur'an before 800 CE (within 168 years after the death of Muhammad), according to Corpus Coranicum. However, in 2015, experts from the University of Birmingham discovered the Birmingham Quran manuscript, which is possibly the oldest manuscript of the Quran in the world. Radiocarbon analysis to determine the age of the manuscript revealed that this manuscript could be traced back to between 6th or 7th century. Selected manuscripts from the first four centuries after the death of Muhammad (632–1032 CE) are listed below.

Hijazi manuscripts

Hijazi manuscripts are some of the earliest forms of Quranic texts, and can be characterized by Hijazi script. Hijazi script is distinguished by its "informal, sloping Arabic script." The most widely used Qurans were written in the Hijazi style script, a style that originates before Kufic style script. This is portrayed by the rightward inclining of the tall shafts of the letters, and the vertical extension of the letters.

Codex Parisino-petropolitanus

The so-called Codex Parisino-petropolitanus formerly conserved portions of two of the oldest extant Quranic manuscripts. Most surviving leaves represent a Quran that is preserved in various fragments, the largest part of which are kept in the Bibliothèque nationale de France, as BNF Arabe 328(ab). Forty-six leaves are held at the National Library of Russia and one each in the Vatican Library (Vat. Ar. 1605/1) and in the Khalili Collection of Islamic Art.

BnF Arabe 328(c)

BnF Arabe 328(c), formerly bound with BnF Arabe 328(ab), has 16 leaves, with two additional leaves discovered in Birmingham in 2015 (Mingana 1572a, bound with an unrelated Quranic manuscript).
 
 
BnF Arabe 328(c) was part of the lot of pages from the store of Quranic manuscripts at the Mosque of Amr ibn al-As in Fustat bought by French Orientalist Jean-Louis Asselin de Cherville (1772–1822) when he served as vice-consul in Cairo during 1806–1816.
 
The 16 folia in Paris contain the text of chapter 10:35 to 11:95 and of 20:99 to 23:11.

The Birmingham folia cover part of the lacuna (gap) in the Paris portion, with parts of the text of suras 18, 19 and 20.

Birmingham Quran manuscript

The Birmingham Quran manuscript parchment of two leaves (cataloged as Mingana 1572a) has been radiocarbon dated to between 568 and 645 CE with a confidence of 97.2%, indicating the animal from which the parchment was made lived during that time.

The parts of Surahs 18-20 it leaves preserve
are written in ink on parchment, using an Arabic Hijazi script and are still clearly legible. The leaves are folio size (343 mm by 258 mm at the widest point), and are written on both sides in a generously scaled and legible script. The text is laid out in the format that was to become standard for complete Quran texts, with chapter divisions indicated by linear decoration, and verse endings by intertextual clustered dots.

Marijn van Putten, who has published work on idiosyncratic orthography common to all early manuscripts of the Uthmanic text type has stated and demonstrated with examples that due to a number of these same idiosyncratic spellings present in the Birmingham fragment (Mingana 1572a + Arabe 328c), it is "clearly a descendant of the Uthmanic text type" and that it is "impossible" that it is a pre-Uthmanic copy, despite its early radiocarbon dating.

Tübingen fragment
In November 2014, the University of Tübingen in Germany announced that a partial Quran manuscript in their possession (Ms M a VI 165), had been carbon dated (with a confidence of 94.8%), to between 649 and 675. The manuscript is now recognised as being written in hijazi script, although in the 1930 catalogue of the collection it is classified as "Kufic", and consists of the Quranic verses 17:36, to 36:57 (and part of verse 17:35).

Sana'a manuscript

The Sana'a manuscript, is one of the oldest Quranic manuscripts in existence. It contains only three chapters. It was found, along with many other Quranic and non-Quranic fragments, in Yemen in 1972 during restoration of the Great Mosque of Sana'a. The manuscript is written on parchment, and comprises two layers of text (see palimpsest). The upper text conforms to the standard 'Uthmanic Quran, whereas the lower text contains many variants to the standard text. An edition of the lower text was published in 2012. A radiocarbon analysis has dated the parchment containing the lower text to before 671 AD with a 99% accuracy.

Add. 1125
This manuscript was acquired by University of Cambridge from Edward H. Palmer (1840-1882) and EE Tyrwhitt Drake. It was created before 800CE according to Corpus Coranicum.

Ms. Or. 2165
British Library MS. Or. 2165 Early Qur'anic manuscript written in Ma'il script, 7th or 8th century CE.

Codex Mashhad 

The term Codex Mashhad refers to an old codex of the Qurʾān, now mostly preserved in two manuscripts, MSS 18 and 4116, in the Āstān-i Quds Library, Mashhad, Iran. The first manuscript in 122 folios and the second in 129 folios together constitute more than 90% of the text of the Qurʾān, and it is also likely that other fragments will be found in Mashhad or elsewhere in the world. The current Codex is in two separate volumes, MSS 18 and 4116. The former contains the first half of the Qurʾān, from the beginning to the end of the 18th sūra, al-Kahf, while the latter comprises the second half, from the middle of the 20th sūra, Ṭāhā, to the end of the Qurʾān. In their present form, both parts of Codex Mashhad have been repaired, partially completed with pieces from later Kufic Qurʾāns and sometimes in a present-day nashkī hand.

Codex Mashhad has almost all the elements and features of the oldest known Qurʾānic codices. The dual volumes of the main body, written in ḥijāzī or māʾil script, are the only ḥijāzī manuscripts in vertical format in Iran. Like all ancient ḥijāzī codices, Codex Mashhad contains variant readings, regional differences of Qurʾānic codices, orthographic peculiarities, and copyists’ errors, partly corrected by later hands. The script and orthography of the Codex show instances of archaic and not-yet-completely-recognized rules, manifested in various spelling peculiarities. Illumination and ornamentation are not found even in sūra-headbands; rather, some crude sūra dividers have been added later and are found only on adjoining sections.

It is also important to note the script in this manuscript is similar to Codex M a VI 165 at Tübingen (Germany),  Codex Arabe 331 at the Bibliothèque Nationale (Paris), and Kodex Wetzstein II 1913 at Staatsbibliothek (Berlin). The combined radiocarbon dating of these manuscripts points firmly to the 1st century of hijra.

Kufic manuscripts

Kufic manuscripts can be characterized by the Kufic form of calligraphy. Kufic calligraphy, which was later named after art historians in the 19th or 20th century is described by means of precise upstanding letters. For a long time, the Blue Qur'an, the Topkapi manuscript, and the Samarkand Kufic Quran were considered the oldest Quran copies in existence. Both codices are more or less complete. They are written in the Kufic script. It "can generally be dated from the late eighth century depending on the extent of development in the character of the script in each case."

The Blue Quran 

The Blue Qur'an (Arabic: المصحف الأزرق al-Muṣḥaf al-′Azraq) is a late 9th to early 10th-century Tunisian Qur'an manuscript in Kufic calligraphy, probably created in North Africa for the Great Mosque of Kairouan. It is among the most famous works of Islamic calligraphy, and has been called "one of the most extraordinary luxury manuscripts ever created." Because the manuscript was done in Kufic style writing, it is quite hard to read. "The letters have been manipulated to make each line the same length, and the marks necessary to distinguish between letters have been omitted." The Blue Quran is constructed of indigo-dyed parchment with the inscriptions done in gold ink, which makes it one of the rarest Quran productions ever known. The use of dyed parchment and gold ink is said to have been inspired by the Christian Byzantine Empire, due to the fact that many manuscripts were produced in the same way there. Each verse is separated by circular silver marks, although they are now harder to see due to fading and oxidization.

Topkapi manuscript
 
The Topkapi manuscript is an early manuscript of the Quran dated to the early 8th century. It is kept in the Topkapi Palace Museum, Istanbul, Turkey. Originally attributed to Uthman Ibn Affan (d. 656), but because of its illumination, it is now thought the manuscript could not date from the period (mid 7th century) when the copies of the Caliph Uthman were written.

Samarkand Kufic Quran

The Samarkand Kufic Quran, preserved at Tashkent, is a Kufic manuscript, in Uzbek tradition identified as one of Uthman's manuscripts, but dated to the 8th or 9th century by both paleographic studies and carbon-dating of the parchment. Radio-carbon dating showed a 95.4% probability of a date between 795 and 855.

Gilchrist's dating of any Kufic manuscript to the later 8th century has been criticized by other scholars, who have cited many earlier instances of early Kufic and pre-Kufic inscriptions. The most important of these are the Quranic inscriptions in Kufic script from the founding of the Dome of the Rock in Jerusalem (692). 
Inscriptions on rock Hijazi and early Kufic script may date as early as 646. The debate between the scholars has moved from one over the date origin of the script to one over the state of development of the Kufic script in the early manuscripts and in datable 7th-century inscriptions.

Gotthelf Bergsträßer Archive
This almost complete Quranic manuscript was photographed by Otto Pretzl in 1934 in Morocco. In recent years, a few folios from the manuscripts have been sold by private companies and were dated to the 9th century or earlier by Christie's.

Other manuscripts

The Ma'il Quran

The Ma'il Quran is an 8th-century Quran (between 700 and 799 CE) originating from the Arabian peninsula. It contains two-thirds of the Qur'ān text and is one of the oldest Qur'āns in the world. It was purchased by the British Museum in 1879 from the Reverend Greville John Chester and is now kept in the British Library.

Significance

The dating and text of early manuscripts of the Qur'an have been used as evidence in support of the traditional Islamic views and by sceptics to cast doubt on it. The high number of manuscripts and fragments present from the first 100 years after the reported canonization have made the text one ripe for academic discussion. Founder of the revisionist Islamic studies movement in the mid 20th century, John Wansbrough, used the content in the Qur'an as a reference point for ascertaining that it was likely influenced by the Umayyad court, and believed its cannon to have likely happened around the same time as that of the Islamic Hadith movement. Although never the dominant academic view, with the advent of radiocarbon dating, the view is currently held only by a few scholars. The more recently uncovered Birmingham Quran manuscript holds significance amongst scholarship because of its early dating and potential overlap with the lifetime of Muhammad  to 632 CE, (the proposed radiocarbon dating gives a 95.4% confidence that the animal whose skin made the manuscript parchment was killed sometime between calendar years 568–645 CE). The text's identitcal reflection of the contemporary standard text of the Quran has generally lent credence to early Muslim narratives and provided a retort for historic criticisms levied at the text. Emilio Platti, Professor Emeritus at the Catholic University of Leuven, for example holds that "scholars largely refuse today the late dating of the earliest copies of the Qurʾān proposed for example by John Wansbrough". David Thomas, professor of Christianity and Islam at the University of Birmingham, states that "the parts of the Qur’an that are written on this parchment can, with a degree of confidence, be dated to less than two decades after Muhammad’s death."

Joseph Lumbard also claims that the dating renders "the vast majority of Western revisionist theories regarding the historical origins of the Quran untenable," and quotes a number of scholars (Harald Motzki, Nicolai Sinai) in support of "a growing body of evidence that the early Islamic sources, as Carl Ernst observes, 'still provide a more compelling framework for understanding the Qurʾan than any alternative yet proposed.'"

Behnam Sadeghi and Uwe Bergmann write that the Sana'a manuscript is unique among extant early Quranic manuscripts, "the only known manuscript" that "does not belong to the 'Uṯmānic textual tradition". Those Hijazi manuscript fragments belonging to the "'Uṯmānic textual tradition" and dated by radio-carbon to the first Islamic century are not identical. They fall "into a small number of regional families (identified by variants in their rasm, or consonantal text), and each moreover contains non-canonical variants in dotting and lettering that can often be traced back to those reported of the Companions"

Michael Cook and Marijn van Putten have provided evidence that the regional variants of the early Hijazi manuscript fragments share a "stem" and thus likely "descend from a single archetype", (that being Uthmanic codex in traditional Islamic history).

Prior to the dating of earlier text, a controversial anonymous writer described as "antiquranian"  Ibn Warraq argued that "the sheer number" of variants in the orthography in early Quranic manuscripts "dated as early as 715 A.D. seem to cast doubt on the traditional account of the compilation of the Koran". The similarly aged Sana'a manuscript fragments (95% probability of parchment being produced between 578 CE and 669 CE) had 5000+ deviations in their rasm, "seem to suggest that even in the 8th century A.D., there was no definitive text of the Koran" according to Ibn Warraq. Lumbard, on the other hand, states that "all" the Sana'a "variations had already been and recorded in the Islamic historiographical tradition". Ibn Warraq to conclude, "there are indeed some leaves, folios and Koranic inscriptions that have been dated to the Eighth Century C.E. or earlier but no complete Qur'ans that can be dated with confidence to earlier than the Ninth Century".

See also
 History of the Quran
 Arabic miniature (origins section) 
 Corpus Coranicum
 Quranic inerrancy

Notes

References

Sources

Further reading